The Shio-Mgvime Monastery (literally meaning "the cave of Shio") is a medieval monastic complex in Georgia, near the town of Mtskheta.

The Shio-Mgvime complex
According to a historic tradition, the first monastic community at this place was founded by the 6th-century monk Shio, one of the Thirteen Assyrian Fathers who came to Georgia as Christian missionaries. St. Shio is said to have spent his last years as a hermit in a deep cave near Mtskheta subsequently named  ("the Cave of Shio") after him. The earliest building – the Monastery of St. John the Baptist – a cruciform church, very plain and strict in its design, indeed dates to that time, and the caves curved by monks are still visible around the monastery and along the road leading to the complex. The church has an octagonal dome covered with a conic floor and once housed a masterfully ornate stone iconostasis which is now on display at the Art Museum of Georgia in Tbilisi. The monastery was somewhat altered in the 11th and 18th centuries, but has largely retained its original architecture.

The Upper Church named after the Theotokos is a central part of the Shio-Mgvime complex constructed at the verge of the 12th century at the behest of King David IV of Georgia. Initially a domed church, it was subsequently destroyed by a foreign invasion and restored, in 1678, as a basilica. A refectory was built between the 12th and 17th centuries and directly communicates with the Cave of St. Shio. A 12th-century small chapel adorned with medieval murals stands separately on a nearby hill.

History

Shio-Mgvime quickly turned into the largest monastic community in Georgia and by the end of the 6th century it was populated by as many as 2,000 monks. It became a vibrant center of cultural and religious activities and remained under the personal patronage of Catholicoi of Georgia. David IV "the Builder" (1089–1125) made it a royal domain and dictated regulations (typicon) for the monastery (1123). The downfall of the medieval Georgian kingdom and incessant foreign invasions resulted in the decline of the monastery. It saw a relative revival when the Georgian king George VIII granted Shio-Mgvime and its lands to the noble family of Zevdginidze-Amilakhvari to whom the monastery served as a familial burial ground up to the 1810s.

The monastery was ravaged by the invading Persian troops sent by Shah Abbas I of Safavid in 1614–6. Prince Givi Amilakhvari reconstructed it in 1678, but the 1720s Ottoman occupation of Georgia brought about another devastation and depopulation of Shio-Mgvime. Restored by Prince Givi Amilakhvari in 1733, the monastery was raided and the monks massacred by the Persians less than two years later. Subsequently, Shio-Mgvime was restored and its interior renovated in the 19th century, but it never regained its past importance and role in the spiritual life of Georgia. Under Bolshevik rule, the monastery was closed, but it is now functional and attracts many pilgrims and tourists.

See also
August Uprising

References
K'artuli Sabch'ota Entsiklopedia (Encyclopaedia Georgiana), Vol. 11, p. 6, Tb., 1987.
Parliament of Georgia  website.
 შიომღვიმის მამათა მონასტერი (Shiomgvime Monastery).

External links

Georgian Orthodox monasteries
560s establishments
Christian monasteries established in the 6th century